Weirton Steel Corporation was a steel production company founded by Ernest T. Weir in West Virginia in 1909. It was at one time one of the world's largest producers of tin plate products.

History 
Weirton Steel Corporation was an integrated steel mill founded in 1909 by Ernest T. Weir. In 1905, Weir and his partner, James Phillips, bought a tin mill in Clarksburg, West Virginia. In 1909, they relocated to Hollidays Cove, West Virginia, and expanded the operation. The location was chosen due to the abundant water supply, much needed for steel production, and the convenient access to major steel markets.

In 1929, Weir merged Weirton Steel with Detroit's Michigan Steel and Cleveland's M. A. Hanna Company to form National Steel Corporation. National Steel became on the largest steel producers in the United States, but by the end of the century, the company was experiencing financial difficulties.

Weirton Steel became the largest Employee Stock Ownership Plan (ESOP) steel plant in the world when employees purchased stocks in the 1980s. After Weirton Steel filed for bankruptcy, with 3,000 employees, Ohio-based International Steel Group (ISG) submitted a low offer of $237 million. On April 22, 2004, U.S. federal bankruptcy Judge L. Edward Friend II ruled that ISG could purchase Weirton Steel. By court order, the assets were then auctioned, with most being acquired by ISG, which formed a new division called ISG Weirton Steel.

On April 5, 2005, ISG completed a merger with Mittal Steel. In 2006, Mittal Steel completed a further merger with Arcelor, forming a new company known as ArcelorMittal.

In December 2020, ArcelorMittal sold its U.S. holdings to Ohio-based Cleveland-Cliffs Inc. making it a subsidiary of the Cleveland-Cliffs organization.

Weirton Steel Works

Located in Weirton, West Virginia, the integrated steel mill had four blast furnaces (1919, 1926, 1941 and 1952), an open-hearth shop (1920) and a bessemer converter (1936). It was one of the world´s largest producers of tin plate products. A basic oxygen plant was constructed in 1965.

See also
 List of steel producers

References

External links

The History of Weirton Steel Corporation

ArcelorMittal
Manufacturing companies established in 1909
Steel companies of the United States
1909 establishments in West Virginia
Manufacturing companies disestablished in 2004
2004 disestablishments in West Virginia